Ojós is a municipality in the autonomous community of Murcia in southeastern Spain. It is located in the south-west of the north-eastern quarter of the region and has an area of 45.3 km 2 and shares borders with Blanca at its north, Ulea at its north-east, Villanueva del Río Segura at its East, Campos del Río at is south-west and Ricote at its north-west. The municipality was inhabited by 500 people in 2019.

Demographics 
There was a 0.2% of foreigners in 2019. The table below shows the population trends in the 20th and 21st centuries.

Economy 
Agriculture is highly performed in Ojós. 22.7% of the surface is occupied with crop lands and a large majority are planted with trees. The most widely grown products are the apricots, the lemons and the almonds. 69.54% of the agreements were signed for workers of the agricultural and fishing sectors in 2019 and 27.58% for jobs of the service sector.

References 

Municipalities in the Region of Murcia